King's Bridge is a road bridge spanning the River Clyde in Glasgow, Scotland. The bridge links Hutchesontown to the west (left bank) and Glasgow Green to the east (right bank) near the city centre.

King's Bridge, which carries the A74, is the second such structure crossing the river at that point. The original was wooden and completed in 1901, opening on the same day as the original Polmadie Bridge nearby. The current, wider version was built in 1933 and has four 21-metre spans containing a series of rivetted steel plate girders which support the reinforced concrete bridge deck. With deep foundations, the piers divide at low level to create the arches. The bridge is a low-level bridge and was built by the Sir William Arrol & Co. firm to a design by TPM Somers.

References

External links

Bridges completed in 1933
Bridges in Glasgow
Bridges across the River Clyde
Glasgow Green
Gorbals
1933 establishments in Scotland